R. Paskaralingam is a Sri Lankan civil servant. He was selected in one of the last batches of the Ceylon Civil Service, before it became the Sri Lankan Administrative Service. He was a government agent, served as secretary to the Treasury  (1989 – 1994) and as a senior advisor to the Prime Minister of Sri Lanka (2002–2004 and 2015–2019).

References

Living people
Date of birth missing (living people)
Permanent secretaries of Sri Lanka
Sri Lankan Tamil civil servants
Year of birth missing (living people)